Tatari is a monotypic genus of Ni-Vanuatu jumping spiders containing the single species, Tatari multispinosus. It was first described by Lucien Berland in 1938, and is found only on Vanuatu. The species name is derived from Latin, meaning "having multiple spines".

References

Endemic fauna of Vanuatu
Salticidae
Spiders of Oceania
Taxa named by Lucien Berland